The following is a list of fictional astronauts from the era of the Apollo program and the early history of the Soyuz spacecraft, during the "Golden Age" of space travel.

Project Apollo era

See also
 Moon landings in fiction
 Moon in science fiction
 List of appearances of the Moon in fiction

Notes

References

Lists of fictional astronauts